The Russian desman (Desmana moschata) ( vykhukhol) is a small semiaquatic mammal that inhabits the Volga, Don and Ural River basins in Russia, Ukraine and Kazakhstan. It constructs burrows into the banks of ponds and slow-moving streams, but prefers small, overgrown ponds with abundance of insects, crayfish and amphibians. The Russian desman often lives in small groups of two to five animals, that are usually not related, and appears to have a complex (but largely unstudied) communication and social system.

Taxonomy 

The Russian desman is one of two surviving species of the tribe Desmanini, the other being the Pyrenean desman. Despite its outward similarity to muskrats (a rodent), the Russian desman is actually part of the mole family Talpidae in the order Eulipotyphla. Like other moles, it is functionally blind and obtains much of its sensory input from the touch-sensitive Eimer's organs at the end of its long, bilobed snout. However, the hind feet are webbed and the tail is laterally flattened —specializations for its aquatic habitat. Easily the largest species of mole, it weighs . 
Decidedly rich and thick in nature, desman fur used to be highly sought after by the fur trade. Consequently, the Russian desman is now a protected species under Russian law. However, due to loss of habitat (farming), water pollution, illegal fishing nets, and the introduction of non-native species like muskrat, population levels continue to decline. In the mid-1970s, an estimated 70,000 desmans were left in the wild; by 2004, the figure was only 35,000. However, in some Russian regions, the number of desmans appears to be increasing.

Distribution and habitat 
From 2009 to 2011, the Don Basin rivers were searched for Russian desman to evaluate if this environment was sustainable for the species. No evidence was found that the species lives in this area but if so, the population was very small. The limiting factors consist of global factors, interspecific  processes, and new immigrating species in the river ecosystem.

Characteristics 
Russian desman provide comfort to themselves by grooming. More specifically, scratching with hind feet, washing, biting out of nails, and biting out of fur. The main reasons for these actions are supporting the air layer and heat-insulating properties of fur.

References

External links

 ARKive - images and movies of the Russian desman (Desmana moschata)

Talpidae
Mammals of Asia
Desman, Russian
Mammals of Central Asia
Mammals of Russia
Fauna of Ukraine
Desman, Russian
Endangered biota of Europe
Endangered biota of Asia
Mammals described in 1758
Taxa named by Carl Linnaeus
Semiaquatic mammals